Cheryl Strayed (née Nyland; born September 17, 1968) is an American writer and podcast host. She has written four books: the novel Torch (2006) and the nonfiction books Wild: From Lost to Found on the Pacific Crest Trail (2012), Tiny Beautiful Things (2012) and Brave Enough (2015). Wild, which told the story of a long hike that Strayed took in 1995, was an international bestseller, and was adapted as the 2014 film Wild.

Early life 
Strayed was born in Spangler, Pennsylvania, the second daughter of Barbara Anne "Bobbi" (née Young; 1945–1991) and Ronald Nyland. From age three to six, Strayed was sexually abused by her paternal grandfather. At age six, she moved with her family from Pennsylvania to Chaska, Minnesota. Her parents divorced soon after and Cheryl's father left her life. When Cheryl was 12 her mother married Glenn Lambrecht, and the following year the family moved to rural Aitkin County, where they lived in a house that they had built themselves on 40 acres. The house did not have electricity or running water for the first few years. Indoor plumbing was installed after Strayed moved away for college. Strayed also has two half-siblings from her father's second marriage, with whom she connected only after ‘Wild’ was published.

In 1986, at the age of 17, Strayed graduated from McGregor High School in McGregor, Minnesota, where she was a track and cross country runner, cheerleader, and homecoming queen. In 1987, during the summer after her freshman year of college, Strayed worked as a newspaper reporter for her hometown county weekly, the Aitkin Independent Age in Aitkin, Minnesota. She loosely based the fictional Coltrap County in her novel Torch on McGregor and Aitkin County. Strayed attended her freshman year of college at the University of St. Thomas in Saint Paul, but by her sophomore year, she transferred to the University of Minnesota in Minneapolis, where she received her Bachelor of Arts degree, graduating magna cum laude with a double major in English and Women's Studies.

In March 1991, when Strayed was a senior in college, her mother, Bobbi Lambrecht, died suddenly of lung cancer at the age of 45. Soon afterward, Strayed developed a heroin addiction. Strayed has described this loss as her "genesis story". She has written about her mother's death and her grief in each of her books and several of her essays.

Strayed worked as a waitress, youth advocate, political organizer, temporary office employee, and emergency medical technician throughout her 20s and early 30s, while writing and often traveling around the United States. In 2002, she earned a Master of Fine Arts in fiction writing from Syracuse University, where she was mentored by writers George Saunders, Arthur Flowers, Mary Gaitskill, and Mary Caponegro.

Career

Strayed has published essays in various magazines, including The Washington Post Magazine, The New York Times Magazine, Vogue, Tin House, The Missouri Review, and The Sun Magazine. Her work has been selected three times for inclusion in The Best American Essays ("Heroin/e" in the 2000 edition, "The Love of My Life" in the 2003 edition, and "My Uniform" in the 2015 edition). Strayed was the guest editor of The Best American Essays 2013 and The Best American Travel Writing 2018. She won a Pushcart Prize for her essay "Munro Country," which was originally published in The Missouri Review. The essay is about a letter Strayed received from Alice Munro when she was a young writer, and Munro's influence on Strayed's writing.

Strayed's first book, the novel Torch, was published by Houghton Mifflin Harcourt in February 2006 to positive critical reviews. Torch was a finalist for the Great Lakes Book Award and selected by The Oregonian as one of the top ten books of 2006 by writers living in the Pacific Northwest. In October 2012, Torch was re-issued by Vintage Books with a new introduction by Strayed.

Strayed wrote the popular advice column "Dear Sugar" on the website The Rumpus starting in March 2010, when the column's originator Steve Almond asked her to take over for him. She wrote the column anonymously until February 14, 2012, when she revealed her identity as "Sugar" at a "Coming Out Party" hosted by the Rumpus at the Verdi Club in San Francisco.

Strayed's second book, the memoir Wild: From Lost to Found on the Pacific Crest Trail, was published in the United States by Alfred A. Knopf on March 20, 2012. It  details her 1,100-mile hike in 1995 on the Pacific Crest Trail from the Mojave Desert to the Oregon–Washington state line and tells the story of the personal struggles that compelled her to take the hike. The week of its publication, Wild debuted at number 7 on the New York Times Best Seller list in hardcover non-fiction.

In June 2012, Oprah Winfrey announced that Wild was her first selection for her new Oprah's Book Club 2.0. Winfrey discussed Wild in her video announcement of the new club and interviewed Strayed for a two-hour broadcast of her show Super Soul Sunday on the Oprah Winfrey Network. The next month Wild reached number 1 on the New York Times Best Seller list, a spot it held for seven consecutive weeks. The paperback edition of Wild, published by Vintage Books in March 2013, spent 126 weeks on the New York Times Best Seller list. The book has also been a bestseller around the world—in the UK, Germany, Australia, Brazil, Spain, Portugal, Denmark and elsewhere, and has been translated into 37 languages. Wild won the Barnes & Noble Discover Award and the Oregon Book Award.

Three months before Wild was published, actress Reese Witherspoon optioned it for her production company, Pacific Standard. Nick Hornby wrote the screenplay, and the film Wild was released in 2014, with Witherspoon portraying Strayed. The film was a box office hit, grossing $52.5 million, and led to Academy Award nominations for both Witherspoon and actress Laura Dern, who played Strayed's mother.

In July 2012, Vintage Books published Strayed's third book: Tiny Beautiful Things: Advice on Love and Life from Dear Sugar, a selection of her 2010-2012 "Dear Sugar" online advice columns. The book debuted in the advice and self-help category on the New York Times Best Seller list at number 5 and it has also been published internationally.

Strayed's fourth book, Brave Enough, was published in the United States by Knopf on October 27, 2015, and in the United Kingdom a week later by Atlantic Books. It debuted in the advice and self-help category on the New York Times Best Seller list at number 10.

Tiny Beautiful Things was adapted for the stage by Nia Vardalos, who also starred in the role of Sugar/Cheryl. The play was directed by Thomas Kail and debuted at The Public Theater in New York City in 2016 and 2017. It is now being staged in several theaters around the nation.

Strayed is also a public speaker and often gives lectures about her life and books. She travels internationally to meet at writers retreats and lead writing seminars. In 2017, she taught a writing workshop to students at BlinkNow Foundation's Kopila Valley School in Surkhet, Nepal; the conversations she had with girls at the school led her to make a short film on the topic of chhaupadi, a form of menstrual taboo which prohibits Hindu women and girls from participating in normal family activities while menstruating.

Strayed has hosted two hit podcasts for The New York Times. In 2020, she hosted Sugar Calling and from 2014-2018 she co-hosted Dear Sugars with Steve Almond. The podcast was produced by The New York Times and WBUR, Boston's National Public Radio affiliate.

The New York Times Company announced the launch of the podcast Sugar Calling on April 3, 2020. The first episode of the show was an interview with George Saunders. The podcast was inspired by Strayed's advice column on The Rumpus called "Dear Sugar." The podcast began during the COVID-19 pandemic and focused on the advice authors had for coping.

Accolades 
In August 2019, Strayed was one of ten women for whom statues were constructed in New York as part of Statues for Equality, a project conceived to balance gender representation in public art.

Personal life
Strayed married Marco Littig in August 1988, a month before her 20th birthday. They divorced in 1995, shortly before she started hiking the Pacific Crest Trail. Following the divorce, she changed her surname to Strayed, a name she chose after months of contemplation. She chose Strayed for its symbolism and because she liked how it sounded together with her first name.

Strayed subsequently married filmmaker Brian Lindstrom in August 1999. They have two children and live in east Portland, Oregon, where Strayed has lived since the mid-1990s. Her daughter, Bobbi Strayed Lindstrom, played the younger version of Strayed in the film adaptation of Wild.

A long-time feminist activist, Strayed worked in her twenties as a political organizer for the Abortion Rights Council of Minnesota, which is now called Minnesota NARAL, and also for Women Against Military Madness, a feminist peace and justice nonprofit organization in Minneapolis–Saint Paul.  She served on the first board of directors for Vida: Women in Literary Arts and has been active in many feminist and progressive causes.

Works

Novels 

 Torch, Houghton Mifflin Harcourt, 336 pages.  (2006). Republished with new introduction by the author, Vintage Contemporaries, 432 pages.  (2012)

Non-fiction 

Autobiographies
 Wild: From Lost to Found on the Pacific Crest Trail, Knopf, 336 pages.  (2012)

Self-help
 Tiny Beautiful Things: Advice on Love and Life from Dear Sugar, Vintage Books, 368 pages.  (2012)
 Brave Enough, Knopf, 160 pages.  (2015)

Adaptations 
 Wild (2014), film directed by Jean-Marc Vallée, based on autobiography Wild: From Lost to Found on the Pacific Crest Trail

References

External links

 
 Dear Sugar Radio
 "Dear Sugar" advice column
 Cheryl Strayed review roundup and links on Biographile
 "Munro County", in The Missouri Review,  Issue 32.2 (Summer 2009): "Messy Art"; Editor's Pick, February 1, 2010
 The Most Inspiring Quotes from Wild

1968 births
21st-century American novelists
American advice columnists
American women columnists
American feminist writers
21st-century American memoirists
American women novelists
Living people

Syracuse University College of Arts and Sciences alumni

University of Minnesota College of Liberal Arts alumni

University of St. Thomas (Minnesota) people
Novelists from Minnesota
Writers from Portland, Oregon
People from Cambria County, Pennsylvania
21st-century American women writers
21st-century American essayists
Journalists from Pennsylvania
People from Chaska, Minnesota
Novelists from Pennsylvania
Novelists from Oregon
American women memoirists